Harold Raymond Mould (8 December 1940 – 13 September 2015) was an English businessman who with Patrick Vaughan formed three successful property businesses. He was also a successful racehorse owner.

References 

1940 births
2015 deaths
English solicitors
English racehorse owners and breeders
Businesspeople from Tyne and Wear
20th-century English lawyers
20th-century English businesspeople